Caryn Davies (born April 14, 1982, in Ithaca, New York) is an American rower. She won gold medals as the stroke seat in women's eight at the 2012 Summer Olympics and the 2008 Summer Olympics. In April 2015 Davies stroked Oxford University to victory in the first ever women's Oxford/Cambridge boat race held on the same stretch of the river Thames in London where the men's Oxford/Cambridge race has been held since 1829. She was the most highly decorated Olympian to take part in either [men's or women's] race.   In 2012 Davies was ranked number 4 in the world by the International Rowing Federation.  At the 2004 Olympic Games she won a silver medal in the women's eight. Davies has won more Olympic medals than any other U.S. oarswoman.  The 2008 U.S. women's eight, of which she was a part, was named FISA (International Rowing Federation) crew of the year. Davies is from Ithaca, New York, where she graduated from Ithaca High School, and rowed with the Cascadilla Boat Club.  Davies was on the Radcliffe College (Harvard) Crew Team and was a member on Radcliffe's 2003 NCAA champion Varsity 8, and overall team champion.  In 2013, she was a visiting student at Pembroke College, Oxford, where she stroked the college men's eight to a victory in both Torpids (spring intercollegiate races) and the Oxford University Summer Eights races (for the first time in Oxford rowing history).  In 2013–14 Davies took up Polynesian outrigger canoeing in Hawaii, winning the State novice championship and placing 4th in the long-distance race na-wahine-o-ke-kai with her team from the Outrigger Canoe Club. In 2013, she was inducted into the New York Athletic Club Hall of Fame.  She has served as a Vice President of the U.S. Olympians Association and as athletes' representative to the Board of USRowing.

Davies has a degree from Harvard University (A.B. Psychology, 2005), a J.D. (Doctor of Law) from Columbia Law School (2013) and an MBA from Oxford University (2015).  Davies is the most decorated Harvard Olympian in any sport. During 2013–2014, Davies served as a clerk to Judge Richard Clifton of the U.S. Court of Appeals for the 9th Circuit in Honolulu, Hawaii. She is currently an attorney with Goodwin Procter in Boston, Massachusetts.

Early career
Davies was recruited into rowing at 12 years of age. She started rowing competitively a year later in Australia in 1996, at the Friends' School in Hobart.  A local rowing club also recruited her into single sculling, where groups of teenagers launched off a beach into tidal estuarine waters.  Within six months she was the Tasmanian under-15 single sculls champion.  Returning from Australia she continued with Cascadilla Boat Club and the Ithaca High School rowing team. In 1998, as a 16-year-old she competed in the world's biggest rowing race, the Head of the Charles in Boston. Because she had already placed in the top three in a junior race at the Canadian Henley the summer before the race, officials insisted on placing her, as the only junior, into the championship category of top senior international rowers; she put up a creditable performance by placing 16th.  The following summer (1999) she made her first national team, coming second in the US junior eight in Plovdiv, Bulgaria, followed by a gold medal in a four at the junior world championships in Zagreb, Croatia, in 2000, the first gold medal ever by US Junior women.  She also won the prestigious Stotesbury cup regatta and the Scholastic Rowing Association single sculls in both 1999 and 2000, and the USRowing Youth invitational in 2000, placing her as the top US junior female rower at the time she left high school.  Caryn's brother Kenneth also represented the US as a junior rower, and well as rowing at Cornell University, achieving the position of Commodore of the Cornell Crew in his senior year and receiving All Ivy Academic Honors for all four years.

College and world championships
Davies rowed for Harvard from 2001 to 2003, leading the team to an NCAA championship in 2003, and again in 2005, after taking a year off for the Olympics. She has again taken a year off from Columbia Law School to compete in 2012.  Most national team training has been based in Princeton, New Jersey, where the US women's team shares a boathouse and a lake with Princeton University, whereas winter training was based in San Diego.

Davies has the ability to row starboard, port, or scull at an international level.  At 6' 4" she was the tallest member of the U.S. Women's National Team.  She was part of the U.S. Olympic women's eight that set a world record in the heat prior to a silver medal in the final in Athens, Greece. She was stroking the eight that repeated the feat in the World Cup in Lucerne in May 2012.  As the most experienced oarsperson on the U.S. women's team she acted as a guiding figure: "Remember it's just like the World Championships – the same people doing the same thing – but with more flags."

As of 2019, Davies has won the C.R.A.S.H-Bs three times: first as a junior in 2000, next in the open category in 2005, and in 2019 (at a rowing age of 37), she again won the open category. She serves as the athlete demonstrating rowing technique in video for the Concept II rowing-machine. Davies also promotes youth fitness through World Fit and gives inspirational talks to youth groups.

Davies' hobbies include travel, sailing, downhill skiing, horseback riding, yoga, and ballroom dancing.  In high school, she competed for several years in competitive downhill skiing, reaching a 7th place in giant slalom in New York State.  As a senior at Harvard, she competed on the ballroom team.

Competitive history

International results

 2012: Samsung World Rowing Cup II, Lucerne, women's eight, 1st, rowing stroke; world record (5:54.17 in the heat) no longer world record.
 2011: FISA World Championships, women's pair, 8th
 2011: FISA World Cup, Lucerne, women's eight, 1st
 2011: Henley Royal Regatta, won the Princess Grace Challenge Cup (women's quadruple sculls)
 2008: Olympic Games, Beijing, China, women's eight, 1st (rowing stroke) gold medal
 2008: FISA World Cup, Lucerne, women's eight, 1st
 2007: FISA World Championships, Munich, women's eight, 1st (rowing stroke)
 2006: FISA World Championships, Lake Dorney, UK, women's eight, 1st (rowing stroke)
 2006: FISA World Cup, Lucerne, women's eight, 2nd
 2006: Henley Royal Regatta, won Remenham Cup (women's eight)
 2005: FISA World Championships, women's quadruple sculls, 5th
 2005: Bearing Point World Cup, Munich, women's quadruple sculls, 3rd
 2004: Olympic Games, Athens, women's eight 2nd silver medal
 2004: FISA World Cup, Munich, women's eight 1st
 2004: FISA World Cup, Munich, women's pair 3rd
 2004: FISA World Cup, Lucerne, women's eight 1st
 2003: FISA World Championships, Milano, Italy, women's four without cox 1st
 2002: FISA World Championships, Seville, Spain, women's eight 1st

Junior international

 2000: FISA Junior World Championships, Zagreb, Croatia, junior women's four without cox. 1st
 1999: FISA Junior World Championships, Plovdiv, Bulgaria, junior women's eight, 2nd

C.R.A.S.H.-Bs: World Indoor Rowing Championship
 2019, C.R.A.S.H.-B. Indoor Sprints, women (open), 1st
2005, C.R.A.S.H.-B. Indoor Championships, women's collegiate open weight, 1st
 2000, C.R.A.S.H.-B. Indoor Championships, junior women, 1st

National results

 2015: Stroked Oxford University women's eight to a win over Cambridge in the first ever Oxford/Cambridge Women's Boat Race on the River Thames
 2013: Stroked Oxford University women's eight to a win in the British University Rowing Championships
 2013: Stroked Pembroke College Oxford men's eight to wins in Oxford University Torpids and Summer Eights
 2006: Australian National Championships, women's senior A four, 2nd
 2006: Australian National Championships, women's senior A quadruple sculls, 3rd
 2005: Head of the Charles, women's double sculls, 1st
 2005: NCAA Championships, women's varsity eight, 3rd
 2003: NCAA Championships, women's varsity eight, 1st

Junior national

 2000: USRowing Youth Invitational, junior women's single sculls champion
 2000: Scholastic Rowing Association of America women's single sculls champion
 2000: Stotesbury Regatta (juniors) women's single sculls champion
 1999: Scholastic Rowing Association of America women's single sculls champion
 1999: Stotesbury Regatta (juniors) women's single sculls champion
 1997: State of Tasmania (Australia) under 15 girls single sculls champion

See also
 Erin Cafaro
 Anna (Mickelson) Cummins
 Susan Francia
 Anna Goodale
 Caroline Lind
 Elle Logan
 Lindsay Shoop
 Mary Whipple
 Kate Johnson

References

External links
 
 
 

1982 births
Living people
Sportspeople from Ithaca, New York
American female rowers
Radcliffe College alumni
Columbia Law School alumni
Alumni of Saïd Business School
Olympic gold medalists for the United States in rowing
Olympic silver medalists for the United States in rowing
Harvard Crimson women's rowers
Rowers at the 2004 Summer Olympics
Rowers at the 2008 Summer Olympics
Rowers at the 2012 Summer Olympics
Medalists at the 2012 Summer Olympics
Medalists at the 2008 Summer Olympics
Medalists at the 2004 Summer Olympics
World Rowing Championships medalists for the United States
21st-century American women
Ithaca High School (Ithaca, New York) alumni